Vankova is a rural locality (a village) in Krasnovishersky District, Perm Krai, Russia. The population was 185 as of 2010. There are 4 streets.

Geography 
Vankova is located 62 km southeast of Krasnovishersk (the district's administrative centre) by road. Simanova is the nearest rural locality.

References 

Rural localities in Krasnovishersky District